Leon Crenshaw (July 14, 1943 − August 22, 2008) was a defensive tackle in the National Football League.

Biography
Crenshaw was born in Greenville, Alabama.

Career
Crenshaw played with the Green Bay Packers during the 1968 NFL season. He played at the collegiate level at Tuskegee University.

See also
List of Green Bay Packers players

References

People from Greenville, Alabama
Green Bay Packers players
American football defensive tackles
Players of American football from Alabama
Tuskegee Golden Tigers football players
1943 births
2008 deaths